Panduleni Filemon Bango Itula (born 2 August 1957) is a Namibian politician, dentist, lawyer, and former Chief Dentist at the Katutura State Hospital, as well as a former SWAPO party school lecturer. He was an independent presidential candidate for the Presidency of Namibia in the 2019 Namibian general election and finished second after Hage Geingob. He is a founder and president of the Independent Patriots for Change in Namibia.

Early life and education
During the apartheid years, Itula was a SWAPO Party Youth League (SPYL) leader in Windhoek, and after several unsuccessful attempts to capture him by the apartheid regime, Itula was arrested at the SWAPO office in April 1979. He was incarcerated, tortured and spent some of this period in solitary confinement. After enduring repression, imprisonment and torture at the hands of the apartheid regime, he was released in January 1980. He left Namibia for London, and arrived on 1 April 1981. The trip to London was organised by anti-apartheid activist Anton Lubowski, and in London, Itula stayed with exiled Anglican Bishop Colin Winter. Itula then worked for the SPYL in London, continuing to lobby for Namibian independence.

He studied in London at the University of Bristol Dental School, and was granted a dental degree by The Royal College of Surgeons of England in 1994. In 1998, he also obtained a Master in Medical Science degree in oral surgery from the University of Sheffield. He also obtained additional qualifications in 2002, when he became a fellow in dental surgery of the Royal College of Physicians and Surgeons of Glasgow and of the Royal College of Surgeons of Edinburgh. In April 2005 he obtained a Post-Graduate Diploma in Dentistry (Sedation & Pain Control) at the University of the Western Cape. Itula also studied for a Masters in Law. Itula had a dental practice at Whitley Bay, a town near Newcastle in north-east England. After 33 years in the United Kingdom, he came back to Namibia in December 2013. Itula was involved in a long-standing feud with the Medical and Dental Council of Namibia over registration as a dental specialist. He previously applied with the council in 2001 and again in 2002 to have his qualifications recognised, and was informed in 2008 that the council had decided not to consider his application because regulations under the Medical and Dental Act of 2008 were not yet in place. Itula eventually won the case and the Council was ordered by the Windhoek High Court to register him.

2019 Presidential candidacy
Despite being a SWAPO member since 1971, Itula declared his intentions to run for presidency in the 2019 Namibian general election as an independent candidate. He subsequently received threats of expulsion from SWAPO. The party cautioned Itula that they already fielded Hage Geingob as its candidate for state president at its contested elective congress in 2017. Itula, however, downplayed the warning, citing that the ruling party at the moment did not have a legitimate candidate for the presidential and National Assembly elections, as it has violated the constitution in the events leading up to the congress in 2017, and also does not have a legitimate disciplinary structure to hold members accountable for violating the party's constitution, thus maintaining that he would not resign from the party despite the threats of expulsion.

Itula had previously called for the resignation of former health minister Bernard Haufiku as well as SWAPO Secretary General Sophia Shaningwa in January 2019, claiming that she was "not fit for the job".

The Namibian Economic Freedom Fighters (NEFF) and the Republican Party (RP), both without a realistic chance in the previous election, withdrew their presidential candidates in early November and instead endorsed Itula.

Itula finished second in the presidential election, gathering 29.4% of the votes. His candidacy was the main reason for the loss of votes for Hage Geingob compared to the previous election, who nevertheless won a second term in office. Because his independent candidacy was seen as "disruptive behaviour by not accepting the party's choice of Geingob as its sole candidate in the 2019 presidential election", Itula was expelled from SWAPO in March 2020.

Personal life
Itula is an avid reader and writer. He is married to Shonag MacKenzie and lives in Windhoek.

References 

1957 births
21st-century Namibian politicians
Living people
Namibian lawyers
People from Oshikoto Region
Ovambo people
SWAPO politicians
Candidates for President of Namibia
Namibian activists
Namibian political scientists
Politicians from Windhoek
Namibian expatriates in the United Kingdom
Augustineum Secondary School alumni
Alumni of the University of Bristol
South West African anti-apartheid activists